Paolo Chiavenna is an Italian amateur astronomer and a co-discoverer of minor planets, credited by the Minor Planet Center with the discovery of 15 minor planets during 1995–2000.

He is an active observer at the Sormano Astronomical Observatory in the north Italian province of Como. The observatory was founded in 1987 and is a member of the GIA (Gruppo Italiano Astrometristi), an Italian association of amateur astronomers who specialize in the observation of minor bodies. Chiavenna's activities there include astrophotography, software development and observation, during the course of which he has made his discoveries, all in collaboration with Francesco Manca, Piero Sicoli, Valter Giuliani, Augusto Testa and Marco Cavagna.

References

External links 
 Sormano Astronomical Observatory: The Staff
 Sormano Astronomical Observatory: The Activity, which includes a list of the numbered minor planets discovered at Sormano, together with their discoverers.

20th-century Italian astronomers
Discoverers of asteroids

21st-century Italian astronomers
Living people
Year of birth missing (living people)